Bilateral relations exist between Italy and Armenia. Italy has an embassy in Yerevan and Armenia has an embassy in Rome.

History

Armenia and Italy have a long-standing relationship since antiquity, when the Etruscan civilization sought to trade with the Armenians in the Kingdom of Urartu. This was later expanded when the Roman Empire began to expand and managed to conquer Armenia, converting it into a province. While the Armenians sought to fight and survive from Roman domination, cultural exchanges between two increased and further strengthened by commonalities, eventually enriched the rich relationship between Rome and Armenia.

Both Armenia and Italy went on to be Christian nations, and carry significant distinction that make their relationship unique. Armenia was the first Christian nation on earth, while Italy is the home of Holy See, the holiest place of Christianity after Jerusalem. Therefore, relations between Armenia and Italy have been tied by the ancient links and Christian connection to even today.

Armenian genocide
The Kingdom of Italy joined the World War I in 1915 and was one of the first nations to condemn the Armenian genocide by the Ottoman Empire. Italian consul Giacomo Gorrini had openly denounced the atrocities by the Ottomans. Due to his effort to prevent the genocide and his later support for Armenian struggle, he was honored in Armenia.

Genetic connection
In 2014, a study research indicated that Armenians shared a quarter of genetic connection with Italians.

Today
Immediately after the collapse of Soviet Union, Italy was one of the earliest nations to recognize the independence of Armenia. When the First Nagorno-Karabakh War broke out, Italy is notable for being the first chairman of OSCE Minsk Group's acting for the peaceful settlement of the Nagorno-Karabakh conflict. President Carlo Azeglio Ciampi, in 2005, reminded that the attempts of the Minsk Group of OSCE had not produced any results yet and stated that he would do his best to strengthen the activity of the Minsk Group.

Italy, in 2000, recognized the Armenian genocide and openly punished those who deny such atrocities. It was further reinforced in 2019, when the Italian Chamber of Deputies adopted an initiative calling on the Italian government to recognize the Armenian genocide and give the issue an international dimension.

Trades
Armenia's trade turnover with Italy has been on a steady rise. In 2018 comprised US$232.48 million, which increased by 15.5% compared to 2017 (US$201.3 million); the export from Armenia to Italy comprised US$49.88 million, the increase was 15.2% compared to 2017 (US$43.28 million), the import from Italy to Armenia, by country of origin, comprised US$182.6 million, the increase was 15.6% against 2017 (US$158.0 million).

Recognition of Artsakh
On 16 October 2020, the city of Milan became the first place in Italy to recognize the Republic of Artsakh, an Armenian separatist nation homeland within internationally recognized Azerbaijani territory. The city of Cerchiara in Calabria later followed in 28 October.

Italy, on the other hand, has not recognized Karabakh and instead urged to solve the conflict peacefully.

Diplomacy

Republic of Armenia
Rome (Embassy)

Republic of Italy
Yerevan (Embassy)

See also 
Foreign relations of Armenia 
Foreign relations of Italy
Armenians in Italy
Roman Armenia
Armenian genocide recognition
Armenia–EU relations

References

External links
Embassy of the Republic of Armenia, Italy
Embassy of Italy, Yerevan

Italy
Armenia-Italy relations
Armenia